Executive Order 14020, officially titled Establishment of the White House Gender Policy Council, was signed on March 8, 2021, and is the 36th executive order signed by U.S. President Joe Biden. The order works to establish the White House Gender Policy Council.

Provisions 
The purpose of this order is to achieve gender equality and promote equal rights in the United States and worldwide. This order is a strategic objective designed to reduce poverty and foster economic growth in the US with the purpose of encouraging gender equality in employment. The council is responsible for the establishment of policies to fight systematic prejudices and sexual harassment. The aim of the Order is to enhance economic security by eliminating structural obstacles to the involvement of women in the workforce and by reducing the salary and wealth disparity.

See also 
 List of executive actions by Joe Biden
2020 United States census

References

External links 
 US Presidential Actions
 Federal Register
Executive Order on Ensuring a Lawful and Accurate Enumeration and Apportionment Pursuant to the Decennial Census

2021 in American law
Executive orders of Joe Biden
January 2021 events in the United States